Mictopsichia hubneriana is a species of moth of the family Tortricidae. It is found in Brazil, Bolivia and Guyana.

Adults vary greatly in size, some specimens have a 2–3 mm smaller wingspan than others.

References

Moths described in 1791
Mictopsichia